J. Bertram Read was an American tennis player active in the late 19th century and early 20th century.

Tennis career
Read reached the semifinals of the U.S. National Championships in 1894.

External links 

American male tennis players
Year of birth missing
Year of death missing